Burhweald (also Brihtwold) was a medieval Bishop of Cornwall.

Burhweald was consecrated between 1011 and 1012. He died between 1019 and 1027. He was succeeded by his nephew Lyfing by 1027.

Citations

References

External links
 

Bishops of Cornwall
11th-century English Roman Catholic bishops
11th-century deaths
Year of birth unknown